Hainan Highway 1 is a dual-lane highway in Hainan, China that was expected to begin construction in May 2019. 

Highway 1 is to be built along the coastline, adding  of new scenic highway to the island to boost tourism. About 1/5 of the highway will have an ocean view. There will be 46 tourism stations located on it. 

Highway 1 will connect 12 cities and counties. It will have 5G technology support, as well as big data and GPS positioning to aid in real-time monitoring and intelligent management. It is also planned to have pilot projects for self-driving cars and electric vehicle charging stations. 

The time of completion for Highway 1 was estimated to be three to five years.

References

Transport in Hainan